The Chairperson of the Democratic Progressive Party is the leader of the Democratic Progressive Party (DPP). The incumbent chairman is Lai Ching-te, elected in January 2023.

Chairmanship 
In the early days of the DPP, the tenure of chairman was only one year. It was extended to two years in around 1990.

After amendments to the constitution of the DPP in 2000, the incumbent President of the Republic of China, if whom is a member of the Party, shall be the chairperson of the DPP upon assuming office and until the end of the tenure. When in opposition, the chairman shall be directly elected by members of the DPP with a two-year term of office, renewable once.

When vacancy of chairmanship occurs and that the remaining term of office is within a year, the Central Committee shall elect a new chair amongst themselves. Otherwise, a by-election shall be held for party members to elect a successor. Before the amendments to the constitution, the vice-chairperson shall be acting chairman during vacancy.

List
 denotes interim chairman

Timeline

See also
 List of Secretaries-General of the Democratic Progressive Party
 List of leaders of the Kuomintang
 List of Secretaries-General of the Kuomintang

References

 
Democratic Progressive Party
Democratic Progressive Party leaders